Ingrid Lilian Thulin (27 January 1926 – 7 January 2004) was a Swedish actress and director who collaborated with filmmaker Ingmar Bergman. She was often cast as harrowing and desperate characters, and earned acclaim from both Swedish and international critics. She won the Cannes Film Festival Award for Best Actress for her performance in Brink of Life (1958) and the inaugural Guldbagge Award for Best Actress in a Leading Role for The Silence (1963), and was nominated for a Best Supporting Actress BAFTA for Cries and Whispers (1972).

Early life and education
Thulin was born in Sollefteå, Ångermanland, northern Sweden, the daughter of Nanna (née Larsson) and Adam Thulin, a fisherman. She took ballet lessons as a girl and was accepted by The Royal Dramatic Theatre ("Dramaten") in 1948.

Career
For many years she worked regularly with Ingmar Bergman. Thulin appeared in Bergman's Wild Strawberries (1957), The Magician (1958, in which she spent much of the film dressed as a boy), Winter Light (1962), The Silence (1963), The Rite (1969) and Cries and Whispers (1972).

She shared the Best Actress award at the 1958 Cannes Film Festival and received a Guldbagge Award for Best Actress in 1964, the first year the award was given out, for her performance in The Silence.

In 1968, she was cast by Luchino Visconti in his historical epic of Nazi Germany, The Damned. Thulin's performance earned a National Society of Film Critics Award for Best Actress.

Winner of the David di Donatello Awards 1974, Thulin was also nominated for the BAFTA Award the same year. In 1980, she was the head of the jury at the 30th Berlin International Film Festival.

Personal life 
She was married to Harry Schein, the founder of the Swedish Film Institute, for more than 30 years until 1989, although they lived separately for many years before divorcing. She bought an apartment in Paris, France, in the early 1960s, and some years later a beach house in San Felice Circeo. In 1970, she became a resident of Sacrofano, Italy, where she lived for 34 years. Her memoir was published in 1992 ("Någon jag kände" ("Somebody I knew"); Norstedts Förlag).

Death 
She returned to Sweden for medical treatment and later died from cancer in Stockholm, 20 days before her 78th birthday.

Legacy 
The municipality of Sollefteå, where Thulin is buried, has given out an Ingrid Thulin Memorial Scholarship annually since 2008. The Scholarship (which is valued at SEK 20,000), is open to any applicants pursuing the arts. It is sponsored by actress Harriet Andersson, Thulin's longtime personal friend.

Selected filmography

 Jørund Smed (1948) – Girl
 Son of the Sea (1949) – Gudrun
 Love Wins Out (1949) – Margit Dahlman
 Jack of Hearts (1950) – Gunvor Ranterud
 When Love Came to the Village (1950) – Agneta
Living on 'Hope' (1951)– Yvonne
 Encounter with Life (1952) – Viola
 Kalle Karlsson of Jularbo (1952) – Elsa
 A Night in the Archipelago (1953) – Ingrid
 The Chieftain of Göinge (1953) – Anna Ryding
 Dance in the Smoke (1954) – Woman in haystack (uncredited)
 Två sköna juveler (1954) – Lilly Fridh
 The Dance Hall (1955) – Cecilia
 Whoops! (1955) – Malou Hjorthage
 Foreign Intrigue (1956, Director: Sheldon Reynolds) (with Robert Mitchum) – Brita
 Never in Your Life (1957) – Lily
 Smultronstället / Wild Strawberries (1957, Director: Ingmar Bergman) (with Victor Sjöström) – Marianne Borg
 Brink of Life (1958, Director: Ingmar Bergman) – Cecilia Ellius
 Ansiktet / The Magician (1958, Director: Ingmar Bergman) – Manda Vogler
 Domaren (1960, Director: Alf Sjöberg) – Brita Randel
 Four Horsemen of the Apocalypse (1962, Director: Vincente Minnelli) (with Glenn Ford) – Marguerite Laurier
 Agostino (1962, Director: Mauro Bolognini) – Agostino's Mother
 Nattvardsgästerna / Winter Light (1963, Director: Ingmar Bergman) (with Gunnar Björnstrand, Max von Sydow and Gunnel Lindblom) – Märta Lundberg
 Tystnaden / The Silence (1963, Director: Ingmar Bergman) (with Gunnel Lindblom) – Ester
 Sekstet (1963) – Elaine
 Espionage (TV series) (1963) - 'The Incurable One' episode
 Die Lady (1964) – Nadine
 Return from the Ashes (1965, Director: J. Lee Thompson) (with Maximilian Schell, Samantha Eggar) – Dr. Michele 'Mischa' Wolf
 La guerre est finie (1966, Director: Alain Resnais) (with Yves Montand) – Marianne
 Night Games (1966) – Irene
 Domani non siamo più qui (1967) – Gioia
 Vargtimmen / Hour of the Wolf (1968, Director: Ingmar Bergman) (with Max von Sydow) – Veronica Vogler
 Calda e... infedele (1968) – Camila
 Badarna (1968) – Cook
 Adélaïde (1968) – Elisabeth Hermann
 O.K. Yevtushenko (1968) – Nando Girl
 Riten / The Rite (1969, TV Movie, Director: Ingmar Bergman) (with Ingmar Bergman and Gunnar Björnstrand) – Thea Winkelmann
 La caduta degli dei (1969, Director: Luchino Visconti) (with Dirk Bogarde, Helmut Berger) – Baroness Sophie Von Essenbeck
 La corta notte delle bambole di vetro (1971, Director: Aldo Lado) (with Jean Sorel, Mario Adorf, Barbara Bach – Jessica
 N.P. il segreto (1971) – N.P.'s wife
 Viskningar och rop / Cries and Whispers (1972, Director: Ingmar Bergman) (with Liv Ullmann, Harriet Andersson) – Karin
 La sainte famille (1973) – Maria
 En handfull kärlek (1974, Director: Vilgot Sjöman) – Inez Crona
 Monismanien 1995 (1975) – Personundersökare
  (1975, Director: Pierre Granier-Deferre) (with Lino Ventura) – Hélène
 Salon Kitty (1976, Director: Tinto Brass) (with Helmut Berger) – Kitty Kellermann
 L'Agnese va a morire (1976) – Agnese
 The Cassandra Crossing (1976, Director: George Pan Cosmatos) (with Sophia Loren, Richard Harris, Burt Lancaster) – Dr. Elena Stradner
 En och en (1978) – Ylva
 It Rained All Night the Day I Left (1980) – Minor Role
 Efter repetitionen / After the Rehearsal (1984, TV Movie, Director: Ingmar Bergman) (with Erland Josephson)
 Il Giorno prima (1987, Director: Giuliano Montaldo) (with Ben Gazzara, Burt Lancaster, Kate Nelligan) – Mrs. Havemeyer
 Orn (1987)
 The House of Smiles (1991) – Adelina (final film role)

References

Further reading
 Cowie, Peter (1970): Sweden 1. An Illustrated Guide ... to the Work of the Leading Directors, Players, Technicians, and other Key Figures in Swedish Cinema, with Credits and Plot outlines to more than seventy important Films, and Index to 1,000 Titles, A. Zwemmer Ltd., London
 Cowie (1970): Sweden 2. A Comprehensive Assessment of the Themes, Trends, and Directors in Swedish Cinema, A. Zwemmer Ltd., London
 Cowie (1977): Film in Sweden. Stars and Players, Tantivy Press, London
 Loman, Rikard

External links

 
 
Ingrid Thulin Official Website (Swedish) (archived)
 Ingmar Bergman Face to Face on Ingrid Thulin
 Bergman's leading lady dies at 76
 Bergmanorama on Ingrid Thulin 
 Ingrid Thulin: Northern Light 
 

1926 births
2004 deaths
20th-century Swedish actresses
Swedish film actresses
Best Actress Guldbagge Award winners
Cannes Film Festival Award for Best Actress winners
Deaths from cancer in Sweden
People from Sollefteå Municipality